McAnespie is a surname. Notable people with the surname include:

Aidan McAnespie (1965–1988), Irish Catholic killed during The Troubles
Alex McAnespie, Scottish football player and manager
Brenda McAnespie (born 1966), Irish ladies' Gaelic football player
Kieran McAnespie (born 1979), Scottish footballer
Steve McAnespie (born 1972), Scottish footballer